Angelici is a surname. Notable people with the surname include:

Daniel Angelici (born 1964), Argentine lawyer and businessman
Martha Angelici (1907–1973), French operatic soprano

Italian-language surnames